Patrick Earl "Pat" Rebillot (born April 21, 1935) is an American jazz pianist and composer.

Early life and education 
Born in Louisville, Ohio, Rebilliot studied music at Mt. Union College and the Cincinnati Conservatory of Music with Jeno Takacs. He graduated with a Bachelor of Music Education in 1957.

Career 
Rebillot is associated with fellow session and studio musicians Hugh McCracken, Tony Levin, Steve Gadd, Ray Barretto and Ralph MacDonald.

A long-time member of Herbie Mann's various line-ups, for which he is also credited as arranger, Rebillot also appears on recordings by John Klemmer, Steely Dan, the Average White Band, Gloria Gaynor, Irene Worth, Bette Midler, Flora Purim, Hall & Oates, David Newman, Jon Faddis, Morrissey–Mullen and others.

Discography

As leader 
Free Fall - with Tony Levin on bass, Steve Gadd on drums, Armen Halburian on percussion and Sam Brown on guitar. Produced by Herbie Mann (1974) - Atlantic Records

As sideman 
With Patti Austin
Live at the Bottom Line (CTI, 1978)
With Warren Bernhardt
Manhattan Update (1980)
With James Brown
Funky President (1974)With Kvitka CisykKvitka, Two Colors (1989)With Paul DesmondFrom the Hot Afternoon (A&M/CTI, 1969)With Frank FosterSoul Outing! (Prestige, 1966)With Gloria GaynorI've Got You (1976)With Mike Gibbs & Gary BurtonIn the Public Interest (1973)With Hall & OatesAbandoned Luncheonette (1973)With Jaroslav JakubovicCheckin' In (Columbia, 1978)With Robin Kenyatta 
Gypsy Man (Atlantic, 1973)With John KlemmerArabesque (1978)With Chuck LoebMy Shining Hour (1988)With Charlie MarianoMirror (1972)With Herbie MannHold On, I'm Comin' (Atlantic, 1973)
Turtle Bay (Atlantic, 1973) 
London Underground (Atlantic, 1973)
Reggae (Atlantic, 1973)
 First Light (Atlantic, 1974) as Family of Mann
Discothèque (Atlantic, 1975)
Waterbed (Atlantic, 1975)
Surprises (Atlantic, 1976)
Reggae II (Atlantic, 1973 [1976])
Gagaku & Beyond (Finnadar/Atlantic, 1974 [1976]) 
Brazil: Once Again (Atlantic, 1977)With Arif Mardin 
Journey (Atlantic, 1974)With David MatthewsShoogie Wanna Boogie (1976)With Jimmy McGriffRed Beans (Groove Merchant, 1976)
Tailgunner (LRC, 1977)
Outside Looking In (LRC, 1978)With Morrissey–MullenUp (1977)With MecoEncounters of Every Kind (1977)With Mark Murphy 
Bridging a Gap (Muse, 1972)With David NewmanNewmanism (Atlantic, 1974)
Mr. Fathead (Atlantic, 1976)
Concrete Jungle (Prestige, 1978)With Chico O'FarrillNine Flags (Impulse!, 1966)With Jimmy PonderAll Things Beautiful (LRC, 1978)With Don SebeskyThe Rape of El Morro (CTI, 1975)With Steely DanGaucho (MCA, 1980)With Joe Thomas'Masada (1975)Feelin's From Within (1976)Here I Come'' (1977)
' 'With Michael Franks'
' 'Passion Fruit'

References 

1935 births
American session musicians
American keyboardists
Living people
People from Louisville, Ohio
University of Mount Union alumni
University of Cincinnati – College-Conservatory of Music alumni

Jazz musicians from Ohio